Denny Kalyalya is a Zambian economist who is currently the Governor of Bank of Zambia.

References 

Zambian economists
Living people
University of Zambia alumni
Year of birth missing (living people)